Dəmirçilər (also, Damirchilyar and Demirchilyar) is a village and municipality in the Tartar Rayon of Azerbaijan.  It has a population of 1,078.

External links 

Populated places in Tartar District